Hyposidra violescens is a geometer moth in the Ennominae subfamily. It is found in Northwestern Himalaya, Northern Vietnam, Northern Thailand, Peninsular Malaysia, Sumatra, and Borneo. The species is infrequent in lowlands and lower montane forests.

External links
The Moths of Borneo

Boarmiini
Ennominae
Moths of Borneo
Moths of Malaysia
Moths of Asia
Moths described in 1895